The National Union was the only permitted party in the United Arab Republic, the political union between Egypt and Syria that existed from 1958 to 1961.

The National Union was founded in Egypt on November 3, 1957, shortly before the founding of the United Arab Republic, by President Gamal Abdel Nasser as a successor to the Liberation Rally.  After the formation of the UAR. In 1958 the National Union also became the only legal political movement in Syria. In the latter country, the National Union was controlled by Ba'athists and anti-communists.

The main objective of the National Union was to mobilize the population behind Nasser's policies, which consisted of Pan-Arabism, reforms and the building of a welfare state. However, the National Union did not become a real mass movement, certainly not in Syria. The latter country withdrew from the UAR in September 1961. In 1962 Nasser replaced the National Union with the Arab Socialist Union (ASU).

References

1957 establishments in Egypt
1962 disestablishments in Egypt
Anti-communist parties
Anti-Zionism in Egypt
Anti-Zionist political parties
Arab nationalism in Egypt
Arab nationalism in Syria
Defunct political parties in Egypt
Defunct political parties in Syria
Nasserist political parties
Political parties established in 1957
Political parties disestablished in 1962
Socialist parties in Egypt
Socialist parties in Syria
United Arab Republic